The 2020 Piala Presiden is the 36th season of the Piala Presiden since its establishment in 1985. The league is currently the youth level (U21) football league in Malaysia. PKNS FC U21 are the defending champions. 21 teams competed in this season. All teams were drawn into two zone, and plays in a maximum of 22 home-and-away matches. Top eight teams after the completion of group stage matches progressed to knockout stage.

Teams 
The following teams were participating in the 2020 Piala Presiden.

Group A (Northern Zone)
 AMD U17
 Felda United U21
 Kedah U21
 Kelantan U21
 Kelantan United U21
 Pahang U21
 PDRM U21
 Perak III
 Pulau Pinang U21
 Terengganu III

Group B (Southern Zone)
 Johor Darul Ta'zim III
 Kuala Lumpur U21
 Kuching FA U21
 Melaka U21
 Negeri Sembilan U21
 PJ City U21
 Sabah U21
 Sarawak United U21
 Selangor U21
 UiTM U21
 UKM U21

League table

Group A

Group B

Result table

Group A

Group B

See also 

 2020 Piala Belia

References

External links 

 Football Association of Malaysia
 SPMB 

Football leagues in Malaysia
Football in Malaysia
Piala Presiden (Malaysia)